Dick Enthoven (2 August 1936 – 21 March 2021) was a Dutch racing cyclist. He rode in three editions of the Tour de France and won the Tour of the Netherlands in 1961.

Major results
1959
 3rd Overall Tour de Pologne
1st Stage 5
 3rd Omloop der Kempen
1960
 2nd Overall Tour du Nord
 6th Circuit des XI Villes
1961
 1st Overall Tour of the Netherlands
1962
 4th Overall Tour de l'Aude
 6th Overall Tour du Nord
 7th Overall Critérium du Dauphiné Libéré
1964
 6th Liège–Bastogne–Liège

References

External links
 

1936 births
2021 deaths
Dutch male cyclists
People from Haarlemmermeer
Cyclists from North Holland
20th-century Dutch people